List of Nematoda has 25,000 recorded species from the Nematode phylum. There are estimated to be a million.

Class  Chromadorea 
Subclass Chromadoria
 Order Araeolaimida
 Superfamily Axonolaimoidea Filipjev, 1918
 Axonolaimidae Filipjev, 1918
 Bodonematidae Jensen, 1991
 Comesomatidae Filipjev, 1918
 Coninckiidae Lorenzen, 1981
 Diplopeltidae Filipjev, 1918
 Order Ascaridida
 Order Chromadorida
 Suborder Chromadorina
 Superfamily Chromadoroidea Filipjev, 1917
 Achromadoridae Gerlach & Riemann, 1973
 Chromadoridae Filipjev, 1917
 Cyatholaimidae Filipjev, 1918
 Ethmolaimidae Filipjev & Schuurmans Stekhoven, 1941
 Neotonchidae Wieser & Hopper, 1966
 Selachinematidae Cobb, 1915
 Order Desmodorida
 Suborder Desmodorina
 Superfamily Desmodoroidea Filipjev, 1922
 Desmodoridae Filipjev, 1922
 Draconematidae Filipjev, 1918
 Epsilonematidae Steiner, 1927
 Superfamily Microlaimoidea Micoletzky, 1922
 Aponchiidae Gerlach, 1963
 Microlaimidae Micoletzky, 1922
 Monoposthiidae Filipjev, 1934
 Order Desmoscolecida
 Suborder Desmoscolecina
 Superfamily Desmoscolecoidea Shipley, 1896
 Cyartonematidae Tchesunov, 1990
 Desmoscolecidae Shipley, 1896
 †Eophasmidae Poinar, 2011
 Meyliidae de Coninck, 1965
 Order Monhysterida
 Suborder Linhomoeina
 Superfamily Siphonolaimoidea Filipjev, 1918
 Fusivermidae Tchesunov, 1996
 Linhomoeidae Filipjev, 1922
 Siphonolaimidae Filipjev, 1918
 Suborder Monhysterina
 Superfamily Monhysteroidea Filipjev, 1929
 Monhysteridae de Man, 1876
 Superfamily Sphaerolaimoidea Filipjev, 1918
 Sphaerolaimidae Filipjev, 1918
 Xyalidae Chitwood, 1951
 Order Plectida
 Suborder Ceramonematina
 Superfamily Ceramonematoidea Cobb, 1933
 Ceramonematidae Cobb, 1933
 Diplopeltoididae Tchesunov, 1990
 Paramicrolaimidae Lorenzen, 1981
 Tarvaiidae Lorenzen, 1981
 Tubolaimoididae Lorenzen, 1981
 Incertae sedis
 Superfamily Haliplectoidea Chitwood, 1951
 Haliplectidae Chitwood, 1951
 Aegialoalaimidae Lorenzen, 1981
 Aulolaimidae Jairajpuri & Hopper, 1968
 Suborder Plectina
 Superfamily Camacolaimoidea Micoletzky, 1924
 Camacolaimidae Micoletzky, 1924
 Rhadinematidae Lorenzen, 1981
 Superfamily Leptolaimoidea Örley, 1880
 Aphanolaimidae Chitwood, 1936
 Leptolaimidae Örley, 1880
 Superfamily Ohridioidea (Andrassy, 1976)
 Creagrocercidae Baylis, 1943
 Ohridiidae Andrássy, 1976
Superfamily Plectoidea Örley, 1880
 Chronogastridae Gagarin, 1975
 Metateratocephalidae Eroshenko, 1973
 Plectidae Örley, 1880
 Order Rhabditida
 Incertae sedis
 Brevibuccidae Paramonov, 1956
 Chambersiellidae Thorne, 1937
 Teratocephalidae Andrassy, 1958
 Suborder Myolaimina
 Superfamily Myolaimoidea Andrassy, 1958
 Myolaimidae Andrassy, 1958
 Suborder Rhabditina
 Infraorder Bunonematomorpha
 Superfamily Bunonematoidea Micoletzky, 1922
 Bunonematidae Micoletzky, 1922
 Pterygorhabditidae Goodey, 1963
 Infraorder Diplogasteromorpha
 Superfamily Cylindrocorporoidea Goodey, 1939
 Cylindrocorporidae Goodey, 1939
Superfamily Diplogasteroidea Micoletzky, 1922
 Cephalobiidae Filipjev, 1934
 Diplogasteridae Micoletzky, 1922
 Diplogasteroididae Filipjev & Schuurmans Stekhoven, 1941
 Mehdinematidae Farooqui, 1967
 Neodiplogasteridae Paramonov, 1952
 Pseudodiplogasteroididae Körner, 1954
Superfamily Odontopharyngoidea Micoletzky, 1922
 Odontopharyngidae Micoletzky, 1922
 Infraorder Rhabditomorpha
 Incertae sedis
 Agfidae Dougherty, 1955
 Carabonematidae Stammer & Wachek, 1952
 Superfamily Mesorhabditoidea Andrassy, 1976
 Mesorhabditidae Andrassy, 1976
 Peloderidae Andrassy, 1976
 Superfamily Rhabditoidea Örley, 1880
 Diploscapteridae Micoletzky, 1922
 Rhabditidae Örley, 1880
 Superfamily Strongyloidea Baird, 1853
 Ancylostomatidae Looss, 1905
 Diaphanocephalidae Travassos, 1920
 Heligmosomidae Cram, 1927
 Heterorhabditidae Poinar, 1976
 Metastrongylidae Diesing, 1851
 Moleinidae Durette-Desset & Chabaud, 1977
 Strongylidae Baird, 1853
 Trichostrongylidae Leiper, 1912
 Suborder Spirurina
 Infraorder Ascaridomorpha
 Superfamily Ascaridoidea Baird, 1853
 Acanthocheilidae Wülker, 1929
 Anisakidae Railliet & Henry, 1912
 Ascarididae Baird, 1853
 Heterocheilidae Railliet & Henry, 1915
 Raphidascarididae Hartwich, 1954
 Superfamily Cosmocercoidea Travassos, 1925
 Atractidae Travassos, 1919
 Cosmocercidae Travassos, 1925
 Kathlaniidae Travassos, 1918
 Superfamily Heterakoidea Railliet & Henry, 1912
 Ascaridiidae Travassos, 1919
 Aspidoderidae Skrjabin & Shikhobalova, 1947
 Heterakidae Railliet & Henry, 1912
 Superfamily Seuratoidea Railliet, 1906
 Chitwoodchabaudiidae Puylaert, 1970
 Cucullanidae Cobbold, 1864
 Quimperiidae Gendre, 1928
 Schneidernematidae Freitas, 1956
 Seuratidae Railliet, 1906
 Superfamily Subuluroidea Yorke & Maplestone, 1926
 Maupasinidae Inglis, 1959
 Subuluridae Yorke & Maplestone, 1926
 Infraorder Gnathostomatomorpha
 Superfamily Gnathostomatoidea Railliet, 1895
 Gnathostomatidae Railliet, 1895
 Incertae sedis
 Superfamily Dracunculoidea Stiles, 1907
 Anguillicolidae Yamaguti, 1935
 Daniconematidae Moravec & Køie, 1987
 Dracunculidae Stiles, 1907
 Guyanemidae Petter, 1975
 Micropleuridae Baylis & Daubney, 1926
 Philometridae Baylis & Daubney, 1926
 Skrjabillanidae Shigin & Shigina, 1958
 Infraorder Oxyuridomorpha
 Superfamily Oxyuroidea Cobbold, 1864
 Heteroxynematidae Skrjabin & Shikhobalova, 1948
 Oxyuridae Cobbold, 1864
 Pharyngodonidae Travassos, 1919
 Superfamily Thelastomatoidea Travassos, 1929
 Hystrignathidae Travassos, 1929
 Protrelloididae Chitwood, 1932
 Thelastomatidae Travassos, 1929
 Travassosinematidae Rao, 1958
 Infraorder Rhigonematomorpha
 Superfamily Ransomnematoidea Travassos, 1930
 Camoyidae Travassos & Kloss, 1960
 Hethidae Travassos & Kloss, 1960
 Ransomnematidae Travassos, 1930
 Superfamily Rhigonematoidea Artigas, 1930
 Ichthyocephalidae Travassos & Kloss, 1958
 Rhigonematidae Artigas, 1930
 Infraorder Spiruromorpha
 Superfamily Acuarioidea Railliet, Henry & Sisoff, 1912
 Acuariidae Railliet, Henry & Sisoff, 1912
 Superfamily Aproctoidea Skrjabin & Shikhobalova, 1945
 Aproctidae Skrjabin & Shikhobalova, 1945
 Desmidocercidae Cram, 1927
 Superfamily Camallanoidea Travassos, 1920
 Camallanidae Railliet & Henry, 1915
 Superfamily Diplotriaenoidea Anderson, 1958
 Diplotriaenidae Anderson, 1958
 Oswaldofilariidae Chabaud & Choquet, 1953
 Superfamily Filarioidea Chabaud & Anderson, 1959
 Filariidae Chabaud & Anderson, 1959
 Onchocercidae Leiper, 1911
 Superfamily Habronematoidea Ivaschkin, 1961
 Cystidicolidae Skrjabin, 1946
 Habronematidae Ivaschkin, 1961
 Hedruridae Railliet, 1916
 Tetrameridae Travassos, 1914
 Superfamily Physalopteroidea Railliet, 1893
 Physalopteridae Railliet, 1893
 Superfamily Rictularoidea Railliet, 1916
 Rictulariidae Railliet, 1916
 Superfamily Spiruroidea Oerley, 1885
 Gongylonematidae Sobolev, 1949
 Hartertiidae Quentin, 1970
 Spirocercidae Chitwood & Wehr, 1932
 Spiruridae Oerley, 1885
 Superfamily Thelazioidea Skrjabin, 1915
 Pneumospiruridae Wu & Hu, 1938
 Rhabdochonidae Skrjabin, 1946
 Thelaziidae Skrjabin, 1915
 Suborder Tylenchina
 Infraorder Cephalobomorpha
 Superfamily Cephaloboidea Filipjev, 1934
 Alirhabditidae Suryawanshi, 1971
 Bicirronematidae Andrassy, 1978
 Cephalobidae Filipjev, 1934
 Elaphonematidae Heyns, 1962
 Osstellidae Heyns, 1962
 Infraorder Drilonematomorpha
 Superfamily Drilonematoidea Pierantoni, 1916
 Drilonematidae Pierantoni, 1916
 Homungellidae Timm, 1966
 Pharyngonematidae Chitwood, 1950
 Ungellidae Chitwood, 1950
 Incertae sedis
 Superfamily Anguinoidea Nicoll, 1935
 Infraorder Panagrolaimomorpha
 Superfamily Panagrolaimoidea Thorne, 1937
 Panagrolaimidae Thorne, 1937
 Superfamily Strongyloidoidea Chitwood & McIntosh, 1934
 Alloionematidae Chitwood & McIntosh, 1934
 Rhabdiasidae Railliet, 1916
 Steinernematidae Filipjev, 1934
 Strongyloididae Chitwood & McIntosh, 1934
 Infraorder Tylenchomorpha
 Superfamily Aphelenchoidea Fuchs, 1937
 Aphelenchidae Fuchs, 1937
 Aphelenchoididae Skarbilovich, 1947
 Superfamily Criconematoidea Taylor, 1936
 Criconematidae Taylor, 1936
 Hemicycliophoridae Skarbilovich, 1959
 Tylenchulidae Skarbilovich, 1947
 Superfamily Myenchoidea Pereira, 1931
 Myenchidae Pereira, 1931
 Superfamily Sphaerularioidea Lubbock, 1861
 Anguinidae Nicoll, 1935
 Iotonchidae Goodey, 1935
 Neotylenchidae Thorne, 1941
 Sphaerulariidae Lubbock, 1861
 Superfamily Tylenchoidea Örley, 1880
 Belonolaimidae Whitehead, 1959
 Dolichodoridae Chitwood, 1950
 Hoplolaimidae Filipjev, 1934
 Meloidogynidae Skarbilovich, 1959
 Pratylenchidae Thorne, 1949
 Tylenchidae Örley, 1880
 Order Spirurida
 Suborder Camallanina
 Order Strongylida
 Superfamily Metastrongyloidea Lane, 1917
 Pseudaliidae Railliet & Henry, 1909
 Superfamily Trichostrongyloidea (Durette-Desset, 1985)
 Amidostomatidae Baylis & Daubney, 1926

Class Enoplea

Subclass Dorylaimia 

 Order Dioctophymatida
 Suborder Dioctophymatina
 Dioctophymatidae Railliet, 1915
 Soboliphymatidae Petrov, 1930
 Order Dorylaimida
 Suborder Dorylaimina
 Superfamily Belondiroidea Thorne, 1964
 Belondiridae Thorne, 1939
 Superfamily Dorylaimoidea de Man, 1876
 Actinolaimidae Thorne, 1939
 Aporcelaimidae Heyns, 1965
 Dorylaimidae de Man, 1876
 Longidoridae Thorne, 1935
 Nordiidae Jairajpuri & Siddiqi, 1964
 Qudsianematidae Jairajpuri, 1965
 Incertae sedis
 Thornenematidae Siddiqi, 1969
 Thorniidae de Coninck, 1965
 Superfamily Tylencholaimoidea Filipjev, 1934
 Aulolaimoididae Jairajpuri, 1964
 Leptonchidae Thorne, 1935
 Mydonomidae Thorne, 1964
 Tylencholaimellidae Jairajpuri, 1964
 Tylencholaimidae Filipjev, 1934
 Suborder Nygolaimina
 Superfamily Nygolaimoidea Thorne, 1935
 Aetholaimidae Jairajpuri, 1965
 Nygellidae Andrassy, 1958
 Nygolaimellidae Clark, 1961
 Nygolaimidae Thorne, 1935
 Order Isolaimida
 Superfamily Isolaimoidea Timm, 1969
 Isolaimiidae Cobb, 1920
 Order Marimermithida
 Marimermithidae Rubtzov & Platonova, 1974
 Order Mermithida
 Suborder Mermithina
 Superfamily Mermithoidea Braun, 1883
 Mermithidae Braun, 1883
 Tetradonematidae Cobb, 1919
 Order Mononchida
 Suborder Bathyodontina
 Superfamily Cryptonchoidea Chitwood, 1937
 Bathyodontidae Clark, 1961
 Cryptonchidae Chitwood, 1937
 Superfamily Mononchuloidea de Coninck, 1965
 Mononchulidae de Coninck, 1965
 Suborder Mononchina
 Superfamily Anatonchoidea Jairajpuri, 1969
 Anatonchidae Jairajpuri, 1969
 Incertae sedis
 Cobbonchidae Jairajpuri, 1969
 Iotonchidae Jairajpuri, 1969
 Superfamily Mononchoidea Filipjev, 1934
 Mononchidae Filipjev, 1934
 Mylonchulidae Jairajpuri, 1969
 Order Muspiceida
 Suborder Muspiceina
 Muspiceidae Bain & Chabaud, 1959
 Robertdollfusiidae Chabaud & Campana, 1950
 Order Trichinellida
 Superfamily Trichinelloidea Ward, 1907
 Anatrichosomatidae Yamaguti, 1961
 Capillariidae Railliet, 1915
 Cystoopsidae Skrjabin, 1923
 Trichinellidae Ward, 1907
 Trichosomoididae Yorke & Maplestone, 1926
 Trichuridae Railliet, 1915

Subclass Enoplia 

 Order Enoplida
 Suborder Alaimina
 Superfamily Alaimoidea Micoletzky, 1922
 Alaimidae Micoletzky, 1922
 Suborder Campydorina
 Superfamily Campydoroidea Jairajpuri, 1976
 Campydoridae (Thorne, 1935)
 Suborder Dioctophymina
 Suborder Enoplina
 Superfamily Enoploidea Dujardin, 1845
 Anoplostomatidae Gerlach & Riemann, 1974
 Anticomidae Filipjev, 1918
 Enoplidae Dujardin, 1845
 Phanodermatidae Filipjev, 1927
 Thoracostomopsidae Filipjev, 1927
 Incertae sedis
 Andrassyidae Tchesunov & Gagarin, 1999
 Suborder Ironina
 Superfamily Ironoidea de Man, 1876
 Ironidae de Man, 1876
 Leptosomatidae Filipjev, 1916
 Oxystominidae Chitwood, 1935
 Suborder Oncholaimina
 Superfamily Oncholaimoidea Filipjev, 1916
 Enchelidiidae Filipjev, 1918
 Oncholaimidae Filipjev, 1916
 Thalassogeneridae Orton Williams & Jairajpuri, 1984
 Suborder Trefusiina
 Superfamily Trefusioidea Gerlach, 1966
 Lauratonematidae Gerlach, 1953
 Simpliconematidae Blome & Schrage, 1985
 Trefusiidae Gerlach, 1966
 Trischistomatidae Andrassy, 2007
 Xenellidae de Coninck, 1965
 Suborder Trichinellina
 Suborder Tripyloidina
 Superfamily Tripyloidoidea Filipjev, 1928
 Tripyloididae Filipjev, 1918
 Order Triplonchida
 Suborder Diphtherophorina
 Superfamily Diphtherophoroidea Micoletzkyi, 1922
 Diphtherophoridae Micoletzky, 1922
 Trichodoridae Thorne, 1935
 Incertae sedis
 Bastianiidae de Coninck, 1965
 Odontolaimidae Gerlach & Riemann, 1974
 Suborder Tobrilina
 Superfamily Prismatolaimoidea Micoletzky, 1922
 Prismatolaimidae Micoletzky, 1922
 Superfamily Tobriloidea Filipjev, 1918
 Pandolaimidae Belogurov, 1980
 Rhabdodemaniidae Filipjev, 1934
 Tobrilidae de Coninck, 1965
 Triodontolaimidae de Coninck, 1965
 Suborder Tripylina
 Superfamily Tripyloidea de Man, 1876
 Tripyloidea de Man, 1876
 Tripylidae de Man, 1876

Incertae sedis 
 Order Benthimermithida
 Benthimermithidae Petter, 1980
 Order Rhaptothyreida
 Rhaptothyreidae Hope & Murphy, 1969

Class Secernentea 

 Order Camallanida (sometimes included in Spirurida)
 Family Anguillicolidae
 Family Camallanidae
 Family Dracunculidae
 Family Micropleudidae
 Family Philometridae
 Order  Drilonematida (sometimes included in Spirurida)
 Order  Oxyurida (= Rhabdiasida)
 Family Heteroxynematidae
 Family Oxyuridae
 Family Pharyngodonidae
 Family Thelastomatidae
 Order  Rhigonematida (formerly in Tylenchia)
 Order  Spirurida
 Superfamily Acuarioidea
 Superfamily Aproctoidea
 Superfamily Diplotriaenoidea
 Superfamily Filarioidea
 Superfamily Gnathostomatoidea
 Superfamily Habronematoidea
 Superfamily Physalopteroidea
 Superfamily Rictularioidea
 Superfamily Spiruroidea
 Superfamily Thelazioidea

Subclass Diplogasteria 
(may belong in Rhabditia)

 Order Diplogasterida
Suborder Chambersiellina Hodda 2007
Superfamily Chambersielloidea Thorne 1937
Family Chambersiellidae Thorne 1937 (Sanwal 1957)
Suborder Diplogasterina Paramonov 1952
Superfamily Cylindrocorporoidea T. Goodey 1939 
Family Cylindrocorporidae T. Goodey 1939
Family Odontopharyngidae Micoletzky 1922 
Superfamily Diplogasteroidea Micoletzky 1922 
Family Cephalobiidae Travassos & Kloss 1960a 
Family Diplogasteridae Micoletzky 1922  
Family Diplogasteroididae Paramonov 1952 
Family Neodiplogasteridae Paramonov 1952
Family Pseudodiplogasteroididae De Ley & Blaxter 2002
Family Tylopharyngidae Filipjev 1918 
Suborder Myolaimina Inglis 1983 
Superfamily Carabonematoidea Stammer & Wachek 1952 
Family Carabonematidae Stammer & Wachek 1952
Superfamily Myolaimoidea Goodey 1963 
Family Myolaimidae Goodey 1963

Subclass Tylenchia 
(may belong in Rhabditia)

 Order Aphelenchida
 Family  Aphelenchidae
 Family  Aphelenchoididae
 Family  Myenchildae
 Family Paraphelenchidae
 Order  Tylenchida
 Superfamily Criconematoidea
 Family  Criconematidae   
 Family  Tylenchulidae
 Superfamily Tylenchoidea
 Family  Anguinidae     
 Family  Belonolaimidae
 Family  Dolichodoridae
 Family  Ecphyadophoridae 
 Family  Hoplolaimidae     
 Family  Heteroderidae     
 Family  Pratylenchidae    
 Family  Tylenchidae     
 Superfamily Sphaerularina
 Family  Allantonematidae  
 Family  Fergusobiidae     
 Family  Iotonchiidae     
 Family  Parasitylenchidae
 Family  Sphaerulariidae

See also
 List of nematodes in Sabah

References

 List of
Nematode
Nematoda